Anexodus sarawakensis is a species of beetle in the family Cerambycidae. It was described by Sudre in 1997. It is known from Borneo.

References

Morimopsini
Beetles described in 1997